The Moon's a Balloon is a best-selling memoir by British actor David Niven (1910–1983), published in 1971. It details his early life. There have been several editions and many translations of the book over the years. Niven followed it with a sequel Bring on the Empty Horses in 1975.

The book is a funny yet tragic tale, detailing everything from the loss of Niven's father to his knowledge of how to lead a good life.

References 

1972 non-fiction books
Show business memoirs